Netball is primarily played in Commonwealth countries, which were heavily involved in standardising the rules for netball. The Federation of European Netball Associations (FENA), sometimes referred to as Netball Europe, is the governing body for netball in the Europe netball region. The organisation was created in 1989/1990. As of August 2016, the English women's national team was ranked 3rd in the world, Wales is ranked 8th, Scotland is ranked 10th, Northern Ireland is ranked 12th, Ireland are ranked 25th, Gibraltar are ranked 31st, Malta are ranked 32nd and Switzerland are ranked 34th.

The major netball competition in Europe is the Netball Superleague. The Netball Superleague is the elite netball competition in England and Wales. The league features eight teams from all areas of Britain.

United Kingdom
In the United Kingdom, netball management has been traditionally run by women. This is different from many other sports for women in the United Kingdom where men have managed women's sport.

England

In England, netball has been popular enough to be included as part of the physical education curriculum. Its inclusion had been at times controversial; during the 1910s and 1920s, schools worried about the potential negative impact of physical exercise like netball participation on the health of girls.

Wales
The Welsh Netball Association (Cymdeithas Pêl Rwyd Cymru) was created in 1945. The WNA is responsible for national championships, Welsh squad selection, international matches, the training and development of players, coaches, and umpires and for the Sport Wales National Centre Netball Academy, Cardiff. The Welsh Netball Association is based in Pontcanna, Cardiff. Similar to other national associations, the Welsh have created a modified version of the game for children called "Dragon Netball". It is geared for seven- to eleven-year-olds.
Male participation in netball in Wales has been increasing in the past several years.

Northern Ireland
The rate of comparative participation for netball to other sports differs from key-stage to key-stage (year levels in school) in Northern Ireland. For girls, netball is the third most popular participation sport in key-stage 2 with a 7% participation rate. For key-stage 3 and key-stage 4, it is the most popular girls participation sport with rates of 20.2% and 14.0% respectively. In the sixth form, netball is the fifth most popular girls' participation sport with a rate of 6.7%. The total number of school participants is about 900. In Northern Ireland, about 1,300 women play competitive netball in club based leagues.

Switzerland
Relatively new to netball, a group of volunteers formed the Netball Switzerland governing body in 2008. They are highly passionate group and have had a formal under 17 team since 2010. With netball teams and matches held regularly in Geneva, Basel and Zurich.

References

Bibliography